Fourmile Creek is a stream in the U.S. state of Wisconsin.

Fourmile Creek was so named for its distance,  from the original Grand Rapids townsite. The name sometimes is spelled out "Four Mile Creek".

References

Rivers of Portage County, Wisconsin
Rivers of Wood County, Wisconsin
Rivers of Wisconsin